The Hip Hop Dance Experience is a dance game for the Wii and Xbox 360 (with Kinect) published by Ubisoft. It is a continuation of The Experience franchise, a spin-off of the Just Dance series.

Gameplay 
The game includes features such as adjustable difficulty levels (Newbie, Mack Skills and Go Hard, with the Wii version using one pre-selected difficulty out of the three), player avatars with over 100 accessories, as well as many game modes, including Dance Party, Dance Battle, Dance Marathon, Power-Skooling, and other single-player or multiplayer challenges. Dance Party gives the player an option of forty songs to choose from, Dance Battle has two or more players perform dance moves to boost their own scores while attempting to take away points from others, Dance Marathon is an endless stream of songs that tests the player's stamina, and Power-Skooling allows the player to perfect iconic dance moves step by step. The choreographers in this game are Laurieann Gibson, Dave Scott and Kid David.

Songs 
The setlist consists of 40 songs. Note that the following are from the Xbox 360 version.

See also 

2012 video games
Dance video games
Fitness games
Just Dance (video game series)
Kinect games
Music video games
Ubisoft games
Wii games
Xbox 360 games
Video games developed in Japan